Kaza is a village in Guntur district of the Indian state of Andhra Pradesh. It is located in Mangalagiri mandal part of Mangalagiri Tadepalle Municipal Corporation part of Guntur revenue division. The great saint krishna Narayana Teertha born here.

Geography 

Demographics 

 Census of India, Kaza had a population of 10,148 with 2490 households. The total population constitute, 5,708 males and 4,440 females —a sex ratio of 779 females per 1000 males. 955 children are in the age group of 0–6 years, of which 485 are boys and 470 are girls —a ratio of 969 per 1000. The average literacy rate stands at 69.06% with 6,349 literates, significantly higher than the state average of 67.41%.

Government and politics 

Kaza gram panchayat is the local self-government of the village. It is divided into wards and each ward is represented by a ward member. The village forms a part of Andhra Pradesh Capital Region and is under the jurisdiction of APCRDA.

Kaza village is a part of Mangalagiri assembly constituency for Andhra Pradesh Legislative Assembly. The assembly segment is in a part of Guntur (Lok Sabha constituency).

Education 

As per the school information report for the academic year 2018–19, the village has a total of 4 schools. These include one MPP, 3 private schools.

Transport 

Kaza lies on National Highway 16. APSRTC provides bus services from Vijayawada, Guntur and Mangalagiri to this region.

See also 
 List of villages in Guntur district

References

Villages in Guntur district